Aquarium Barcelona is an aquarium located in Port Vell, a harbor in Barcelona, Catalonia, Spain.

The 35 aquariums at the facility are home to 11,000 animals representing 451 species. The Aquarium of Barcelona is part of the Aspro Parks.

The aquarium is a member of the Iberian Association of Zoos and Aquaria (AIZA).

Gallery

See also
 List of aquaria

Notes

External links

Tourist attractions in Barcelona
Culture in Barcelona
Nature conservation in Catalonia
Aquaria in Spain
Aquariums
Aspro Parks attractions
Ciutat Vella
Buildings and structures in Barcelona
Zoos
Zoos in Spain
1990s architecture
Buildings and structures completed in 1995